The multi-lane free flow (MLFF) is a system that allows free-flow high-speed tolling for all highway users. With MLFF, current toll lanes at toll plazas can be replaced with ordinary multilane road segments. By using tags with readers at gantry across the highway to detect vehicle and deduct toll using the existing Electronic Toll Collection (ETC) when fully implemented. Using only video and automatic license plate recognition it is also possible to have a MLFF system without using tags and readers. This type of solution is implemented in Stockholm for congestion charging purposes.

Benefits
By implementing the MLFF system, traffic congestion at toll plazas can be reduced as the system allows free flow high speed toll system.

The cost to maintain and operate toll collection system is also much lower compared to current system. With MLFF implementation, toll operator at lane and plaza is minimally required. In current system, the collected cash and data will be managed at plaza level by toll operators. MLFF on the other hand will use back end purse system where the deduction of toll collection and user account will be handled by Central Clearing House at TNG. The current toll plaza canopy will be replaced by a gantry installed with antenna for the purpose of reading the sticker tag or vehicle plate number. This new concept means that toll plaza is no longer required (or much smaller than current toll plaza size) which therefore reduce the construction and operation cost. As for the user, they only need to get the sticker tag and register to their vehicle. Compared to current system, the sticker user needs to get is much cheaper compared to the SmartTAG in-vehicle unit, which costs RM130 to install the In-Vehicle Unit (IU).

Differences

MLFF trial run
The MLFF trial run is carried out by Teras Teknologi (TERAS) under instruction by Malaysian Highway Authority (MHA) to test, evaluate and report the effectiveness of the new highway system and technology before the start of gradual implementation at all highways.

The MLFF trial run will be carried out for the next 6 to 12 months from December 2008. A report on system feasibility, user acceptance and behavioral patterns, enforcement mechanism and proposed project financing will be submitted for cabinet recommendation and approval by Parliament.

In 2021, Green Packet Bhd (Green Packet) and FETC International Co. (FETCi) will run Malaysia’s first ever Multi Lane Free Flow (MLFF) tolling system Proof of Concept (POC) on Malaysian highways. The MLFF POC will be installed at Besraya KM5.5 (North Bound) near Mines South toll plaza and is scheduled for data collection for three months starting early 2022.

MLFF trial tag lane

PLUS Expressways Batu Tiga toll plaza on Federal Highway Route  using single piece on-board unit (OBU). Test directive by MHA to Teras Teknologi and Kapsch with 1,000 test users. Transaction via microwave OBU utilising Touch 'n Go payment gateway.

Damansara–Puchong Expressway , Penchala Toll Plaza In/Out bound using two-piece on-board unit. Test directive by MHA to Teras Teknologi and Mitsubishi Heavy Industries with 100 test users. Transaction via microwave OBU combi with Touch ‘n Go card utilising Touch ‘n Go payment gateway.

See also
 SmartTAG
 Touch 'n Go
 Touch 'n Go RFID
 Multi-Lane Free Flow

Electronic toll collection
Road transport in Malaysia